My Life with Morrissey is a 2003 independent feature film written, produced and directed by Andrew Overtoom. The film won the Audience Award at the Black Point Film Festival in 2003.

Plot
The film chronicles the adventures of an off-kilter career girl whose life goes berserk after she meets her idol, British rock star Morrissey, the former Smiths frontman, who remains a towering figure in the Britrock pantheon.

Cast
Jackie Buscarino as Jackie
Eduardo Acosta as Ed
Carla Jimenez as Virginia
Ben Watson as Routly

Reception

Critical response
The film received mixed reviews from critics and websites. Chris Garcia from FanBoy Planet.com wrote: "A charming turned spooky comedy that more bizarre and unpredictable." [sic?]  Eric Campos from Film Threat.com enjoyed the film and wrote, "this is a funny goddamn movie!"

In a mostly positive review, critic Stephen Dalton of The Times wrote, "Feeling at times like an end-of-term school play, this gleeful examination of deranged fan worship is a sunny cousin to Martin Scorsese's King of Comedy", referring to the 1983 film The King of Comedy.

Awards

References

External links
 

2003 films
2003 comedy films
American comedy films
2000s English-language films
2000s American films